Kumki or Koomkie is a term used in India for trained captive Asian elephants used in operations to trap wild elephants, sometimes to rescue or to provide medical treatment to an injured or trapped wild elephant. The term may be more specifically applied to trained female elephants used as decoys. Kumkis are used for capturing, calming and herding wild elephants or to lead wild elephants away in conflict situations. The word is derived from Persian kumak which means "aid" and is in wide usage from Bengal to Tamil Nadu by mahouts.

Kumkis are not the same elephants widely found in Indian temples. An elephant has to undergo extensive training before it can become a Kumki. Several animal activists have appealed against this training system. Many movies related to kumki elephants have been released in the Tamil film industry, such as Kumki (2012).

References

Elephants in Indian culture